Nova-C is a lunar lander designed by the private company Intuitive Machines to deliver small commercial payloads to the surface of the Moon.

Intuitive Machines was one of nine contractor companies selected by NASA in November 2018 to submit bids for the Commercial Lunar Payload Services (CLPS) program. Nova-C is one of the lunar landers that will be built and launched under that program.
The first Nova-C lander is manifested on the IM-1 mission in June 2023, with a second lander on the IM-2 mission later in the same year. The IM-3 mission is scheduled to launch in early 2024. All three landers will launch on SpaceX's Falcon 9 launch vehicle.

Overview 
The Nova-C lunar lander was designed by Intuitive Machines, and it inherits technology developed by NASA's Project Morpheus. It features a main engine called the VR900 that uses methane and liquid oxygen and produces  of thrust, and an autonomous landing and hazard detection technology. After landing, the lander is capable of relocating by performing a vertical takeoff, cruise, and vertical landing. Methane and oxygen could potentially be manufactured on the Moon and Mars using In-situ resource utilization. Nova-C is capable of 24/7 data coverage for its client payload, and can hold a payload of 100 kg. The Nova-C lander design provides a technology platform that scales to mid and large lander classes, capable of accommodating larger payloads.

IM-1 mission 
Nova-C was selected in May 2019 for NASA's Commercial Lunar Payload Services as one of the first three landers of this program, tasked with delivering small payloads to explore and test technologies to process some natural resources of the Moon. NASA awarded Intuitive Machines US$77 million for building and launching Nova-C.

During the IM-1 mission planned for June 2023, Nova-C will carry up to five NASA-sponsored instruments.  In addition, the lander will also carry some payloads from other customers, including EagleCAM and 1–2 Spacebit rovers. The lander will operate for one lunar day, which is equivalent to about 14 Earth days. The planned landing site has changed several times. At one point it was to land between Mare Serenitatis and Mare Crisium.  the site will be at Malapert A near the lunar south pole.

DOGE-1 and EagleCAM will be deployed as secondary payloads. The DOGE-1 payload has a mass of 40 kg and was paid for with Dogecoin.

Payloads

IM-2 mission 
Intuitive Machines was selected in October 2020 in order to land its second Nova-C lander near the lunar south pole. As of January 2023, IM-2 is expected to be launched in October 2023.

The primary payloads will be the PRIME-1 ice drill, which will attempt to harvest ice from below the lunar surface with the aid of the MSolo mass spectrometer.

ILO-1 prime contractor Canadensys is working to deliver "a flight-ready low-cost optical payload for the ILO-1 mission, ruggedized for the Moon South Pole environment". It could potentially be ready for integration on the  IM-2 mission.

The µNova payload will separate from the Nova-C lander after landing and function as a standalone hopper lander, exploring multiple difficult-to-reach areas such as deep craters on the lunar surface.

A lunar communications satellite will be deployed on this mission to facilitate communications between the lander and ground stations on Earth.

Spaceflight will deliver rideshare payloads on this mission aboard its Sherpa EScape (Sherpa-ES) space tug called Geo Pathfinder.

IM-3 mission 
In August 2021, Intuitive Machines selected SpaceX to launch its third lunar mission, IM-3, in early 2024. It will deliver payloads to Reiner Gamma for the Commercial Lunar Payload Services program.

See also 

Current lunar lander programs
 Chandrayaan Programme, by India
 Chinese Lunar Exploration Program
 Luna-Glob, by Russia

References 

Missions to the Moon
Proposed spacecraft
Private spaceflight
Commercial Lunar Payload Services